Viburnum plicatum is a species of flowering plant in the family Adoxaceae (formerly Caprifoliaceae), native to mainland China, Korea, Japan, and Taiwan. The Latin specific epithet plicatum means “pleated”, referring to the texture of the leaves.

Description

The flowers are produced in flat corymbs  in diameter, comprising a central cluster of fertile yellowish-white flowers 5 mm diameter, surrounded by a ring of showy, sterile flowers 2–3 cm diameter, which act as a target guide to pollinating insects. The fruit is an ovoid blue-black drupe 8–10 mm long.

Plants from Taiwan are sometimes distinguished as Viburnum plicatum var. formosanum Liu & Ou.

Cultivation
Viburnum plicatum is a popular ornamental plant, both in its native area and elsewhere in temperate regions. Some of the more popular cultivars are selected for having all of their flowers large and sterile with few or no fertile flowers; their flowerheads resemble a snowball, giving them the popular name Japanese snowball bush. Cultivars of this type include 'Grandiflorum' and 'Rotundifolium'.

Cultivars
Cultivars with wild-type flowerhead structure are sometimes described as a separate botanical form V. plicatum f. tomentosum. They include 'Cascade', 'Lanarth' and 'Rowallane'. 

The following cultivars in this group have received the Royal Horticultural Society's Award of Garden Merit:

'Cascade'
'Mariesii'
'Pink Beauty'
'Popcorn'
‘Summer Snowflake’

References

plicatum
Garden plants